The Forgotten Holocaust: The Poles Under German Occupation, 1939–1944 is a 1986 book by Richard C. Lukas dealing with the topic of occupation of Poland during World War II, with particular focus on the sufferings of ethnic Poles in occupied Poland in 1939–1945 during the occupation of Poland by Nazi Germany and the Soviet Union. Lukas' most famous work, it has been subject to mixed reception.

The usage of the term Holocaust to refer to non-Jewish victims of the Nazi policies has been noted to be controversial, including by Lukas himself. The book was translated to Polish with editions in 1995 and 2012 as Zapomniany holokaust: Polacy pod okupacją niemiecką 1939–1944. Subsequent editions contain updates and new content. 1997 edition has a foreword by Norman Davies.

Content 
The book focuses on the "slaughter of Poles by German Nazis", including the systematic extermination of polish Jews and crimes committed against the non-Jewish, ethnic Polish population.  The book also discusses the issue of Polish-Jewish relations during World War II including Polish antisemitism and rescue of Jews by ethnic Poles. Appendices include a bibliography, lists of Poles killed for helping Jews and primary source documents.

Reviews 
Gordon A. Craig writing for The New York Review of Books in 1986 referred to the book as an "absorbing account of wartime Poland". The same year, Michael R. Marrus wrote in the Washington Post that "Lukas tells this story with an outrage properly contained within the framework of a scholarly narrative" but criticized what he felt was an unjustified "sustained polemic against Jewish historians", while George Sanford noted in International Affairs that in tackling the subject of the suffering of ethnic Poles, Lukas work is "inevitably polemical", even as it is "strictly objective and academic in tone, presentation and content." He concludes that

There is little dramatically new for specialists in this sound study. But Lukas's argument that Jews and Poles were co-victims should be popularized amongst new generations, so that they can resist extremists, on both sides, who use this issue to drum up support for their respective national fanaticisms.

1986 also saw Donald E. Pienkos publishing a review of the book in the Slavic Review which he later described as "generally praising the book". A year later David Engel published a more critical review in the same journal, in which he states that while the book purports to counter bias, it is a one-sided rebuke of "Jewish historians". In his 1987 review, he enumerated alleged inaccuracies in the book and viewed it as "not only unreliable but thoroughly tendentious". This started a discussion published in Slavic Review until 1991, starting with Lukas' reply to Engel that year. Next year, Pienkos replied to Engel, defending his original review, criticized "Engel's attack upon Lukas's scholarship in his so-called ongoing discussion". Lukas and Engel continued to disagree with regards to the 1987 review with an exchange of several letters, with Slavic Review publishing the final series of letters (including Pienkos' letter from 1988, as well as letters by Shimon Redlich and ) in the 1991 issue of the journal. Maurer criticized Lukas's focus on Jews' "linguistic deficiency" versus other segments of Polish society and their respective dialects and jargons; and his reliance on selected witness statements, rather than on a rich history of Polish literature featuring Jewish characters. Redlich accepts Engel's critique that Lukas would have benefited from a deeper familiarity with his source material and Lukas's critique that Jewish historians have been "influenced" by the Holocaust, but writes the ultimate truth lies with the likes of Jan Błoński and Jerzy Turowicz, whose "intellectual integrity and personal courage" allowed them to admit the role of anti-Semitism in Polish society, and its effects on the treatment of Jews during the Holocaust.

The Slavic Review also published another review of the book in 1986, by Adam A. Hetnal. Hetnal wrote that the book as "the first attempt in the English language to provide a full and impartial evaluation of Poland under Nazi rule". He noted that "Although Lukas's study is praiseworthy and his assumptions are correct, it does not contain any new revelations for well-informed reader". He also criticized the 1986 edition for "sloppy, careless, and hasty editorial work and proofreading" but concluded that "These shortcomings notwithstanding, Lukas deserves praise for his pioneering attempt to examine a neglected and distorted topic with scholarly impartiality".

Edward D. Wynot, Jr. writing for The American Historical Review in 1987 noted that

Although his observations and conclusions may not be welcome to some readers, they merit serious consideration by those seeking an objective and balanced treatment of this explosive subject. In sum, Lukas has produced a book destined to have a major impact on future studies of wartime Poland... Lukas has succeeded in fashioning a study that should stand the test of time and close scrutiny.

, writing for The Slavonic and East European Review the following year, called the book a "notable contribution" and wrote that "[Lukas] is to be congratulated... for his own attempt to achieve a fair and balanced view", concluding that "His book must surely become required reading for students of the holocaust and of contemporary Polish history for many years to come". In 1998 Ewa Thompson in the Sarmatian Review praised the book for focusing on an under-researched area of history less generally known to the American public. In 2012 Stanisław Salmonowicz called the book "valuable" and suggested it can be seen as a balanced, middle ground treatment of the difficult area of the Polish-Jewish history. The Polish edition was also well-received in Poland with positive reviews in the popular history magazine Histmag and online history portal .

Writing in 2007, John T. Pawlikowski noted the comprehensive nature of the work, but criticized its treatment as "a kind of Bible on the subject" within the Polish-American community — Lukas's "basic error" lay in treating ethnic Poles and Jews as "coequal victims of the Nazis".

See also
The Rape of Nanking: The Forgotten Holocaust of World War II

References 

1986 books
History books about Poland
History books about the Holocaust
History books about World War II
Books by Richard C. Lukas